Franklin Oliver Adams Jr. (1881 – 1967) was an American architect in Tampa, Florida.

Background

Adams was born in Waterproof, Louisiana on July 5, 1881. Adams grew up on a cotton plantation and was taught by a governess. He graduated from Centenary College in 1901 with a Bachelor of Science degree and started out as a teacher, "teaching in a log house in Mississippi". He graduated from the Massachusetts Institute of Technology in 1907 with a Bachelor of Science in Architecture.

After graduating, Adams worked as a draftsman for Newhall & Belvins in Boston. He worked as a draftsman and superintendent for Harry B. Wheelock in Birmingham from 1909–1914

He died on November 27, 1967.

Works 
His works include:

 The third Tampa City Hall (1926) 
 Riverview Terrace  
 Plant High School (1927). Tampa, Florida.
 Lakeland Public Library (1927). Lakeland, Florida.
 Harry S. Mayhall Auditorium, demolished (1927–1969). Lakeland, Florida.
 the second Morrell Memorial Hospital 
 Plant City's South Florida Baptist Hospital (1953). 

Works that have been added to the National Register of Historic Places:

 House at 116 West Davis Boulevard (1925). Tampa, Florida; Added in 1989.
 House at 301 Caspian Street (1925). Tampa, Florida; Added in 1989.
 Bay Isle Commercial Building (1926). Tampa, Florida; Added in 1989.
 House at 131 West Davis Boulevard (1928). Tampa, Florida; Added in 1990

References

External links
 Franklin O. Adams papers, n.d., 1868-1944 | University of Miami Special Collections

20th-century American architects
People from Waterproof, Louisiana
Centenary College of Louisiana alumni
People from Tampa, Florida
Architects from Louisiana
Architects from Florida
1881 births
1967 deaths